This is a list of notable wide-scale water shortages.

To be included, the outage must conform to these criteria:
The shortage must not be planned by the service provider.
The shortage must affect at least 1,000 people and last at least one hour.
There must be at least 1,000,000 person*customer hours of disruption.

In other words:
 1,000 people affected for 1,000 hours (42 days) minimum, but if fewer than 1,000 people, event would not be included (regardless of duration)
 One million people affected for a minimum of one hour, but if duration is less than one hour, event would not be included (regardless of number of people)
 For example, 10,000 people affected for 100 hours or 100,000 for 10 hours would be included

Previous

2011
 On September 8, 20 million affected by water outage in Karachi, Pakistan.

References

External links
 Water crisis

Technology-related lists